K. intermedia  may refer to:
 Kerivoula intermedia, the small woolly bat, a bat species found only in Malaysia
 Knema intermedia, a plant species found in Indonesia, Malaysia and Singapore

See also
 Intermedia (disambiguation)